Bighash (also Romanized as Bīghash; also known as Deh-i-Bakhah) is a village in Kamazan-e Vosta Rural District, Zand District, Malayer County, Hamadan Province, Iran. At the 2006 census, its population was 676, in 192 families.

References 

Populated places in Malayer County